Chavalert Chumkum was a former world-class badminton player who represented Thailand from the early 1960s to the early 1970s.

Career 
At a time when Thailand was known for its doubles specialists, Chumkum won more Thai national men's doubles titles than any other player of his era. His Thomas Cup (men's international team) record is particularly noteworthy. Participating in the '60-'61, '63-'64, and '69-'70 campaigns (Thailand declined to compete in '66-'67), Chumkum won 19 of the 23 doubles matches that he contested in ties (team matches) against Indonesia, Denmark, Malaysia, Japan, and India among other nations. He captured the men's doubles title at the 1965 Asian Badminton Championships with Narong Bhornchima. Touring internationally in 1968 he shared the Dutch Open and the Canadian Open men's doubles titles, and reached the All England Open men's doubles semifinal, with Sangob Rattanusorn.

Achievements

Asian Games 
Men's doubles

Asian Championships 
Men's doubles

Mixed doubles

Southeast Asian Peninsular Games 
Men's doubles

International tournaments 
Men's doubles

References 

Chavalert Chumkum
Year of birth missing (living people)
Living people
Asian Games medalists in badminton
Badminton players at the 1966 Asian Games
Badminton players at the 1970 Asian Games
Chavalert Chumkum
Chavalert Chumkum
Chavalert Chumkum
Medalists at the 1966 Asian Games
Medalists at the 1970 Asian Games
Chavalert Chumkum
Southeast Asian Games medalists in badminton
Competitors at the 1967 Southeast Asian Peninsular Games
Chavalert Chumkum